Yuri Kim may refer to:

People
 Yuri Kim (ambassador) (born 1972), American diplomat
 Kim Yoo-ri (born 1984), South Korean actress
 Kim Yu-ri (1989-2011), South Korean fashion model
 Kim You-ri (born 1987), South Korean track cyclist
 Kim Jong-il (1941-2011), North Korean politician who was born Yuri Irsenovich Kim

Fiction
 Yuri Kim, character in White Nights 3.98
 Yuri Kim, character in Faeries' Landing

See also
 Yuri (disambiguation)
 Kim (disambiguation)